Seven Stories Press is an independent American publishing company. Based in New York City, the company was founded by Dan Simon in 1995, after establishing Four Walls Eight Windows in 1984 as an imprint at Writers and Readers, and then incorporating it as an independent company in 1986 together with then-partner John Oakes. Seven Stories was named for its seven founding authors: Annie Ernaux, Gary Null, the estate of Nelson Algren, Project Censored, Octavia E. Butler, Charley Rosen, and Vassilis Vassilikos.

Seven Stories Press is known for its mix of politics and literature, and for its children's books. As the publisher of a large catalogue of activist nonfiction and history from such authors as Noam Chomsky, Angela Davis, Greg Palast and Howard Zinn, Seven Stories has had a major influence on public debate with books on foreign policy, the politics of prisons, and voter theft, among other topics. Prominent titles include Dark Alliance by Gary Webb, 9/11 by Noam Chomsky, A Man Without a Country by Kurt Vonnegut, and Octavia Butler's Parable of the Sower and Parable of the Talents. Innosanto Nagara's A is for Activist, Howard Zinn's A Young People's History of the United States, and Angela Davis's Are Prisons Obsolete?, among many other titles, have educated communities of young people on key aspects of American history. Greg Palast's books have set the standard for raising awareness of vote theft in our elections. Seven Stories has for decades published the annual media censorship guide, Censored, by Project Censored, and the World Report by Human Rights Watch. Seven Stories also publishes a wide range of literature, poetry, and translations in prose and poetry from French, Spanish, Icelandic, German, Swedish, Italian, Greek, Polish, Korean, Vietnamese, Russian, and Arabic.

Imprints

Siete Cuentos Editorial
Launched in 2000, Seven Stories’ Spanish-language imprint, Siete Cuentos Editorial, publishes English-language activist nonfiction and history for Spanish-language readers. Siete Cuentos has published Spanish-language editions of Our Bodies, Ourselves (Nuestros cuerpos, nuestras vidas) and A People's History of the United States (La otra historia de los Estados Unidos), among others. More recent Spanish translations include ‘68 by Paco Ignacio Taibo II, Columbus and Other Cannibals (Colón y otros caníbales) by Jack Forbes, 1491 (Una nueva historia de la Américas antes de Colón) by Charles C. Mann, and A is for Activist (A de Activista) by Innosanto Nagara.

Triangle Square Books for Young Readers
Launched in 2012, Triangle Square publishes progressive picture books, poetry collections, fiction, and nonfiction for preschool through young adult readers with the intent of promoting social justice, multicultural literacy, and environmental restoration. Triangle Square's bestselling titles include A is for Activist and Counting on Community by Innosanto Nagara, The Story of the Blue Planet by Andri Snær Magnason, 10,000 Dresses by Marcus Ewert, and What Makes a Baby and Sex is a Funny Word by Cory Silverberg. More recent Triangle Square Titles include Where Do They Go? by Julia Alvarez, The Wizard's Tears by Maxine Kumin and Anne Sexton, and Arno and the Mini-Machine by Seymour Chwast. Several titles in Triangle Square's For Young People series, which adapts essential adult nonfiction titles for younger readers, have been adopted for middle-grade classes in school districts across the country, including Howard Zinn's A Young People's History of the United States and Ronald Takaki's A Different Mirror for Young People.

Seven Stories UK
In 2016, Seven Stories UK was incorporated in England and is currently based in Liverpool. Seven Stories UK releases separate UK editions of literary titles, especially works in translation, and promotes Seven Stories Press titles with strong UK potential, such as feminist blogger Emma's The Mental Load and The Emotional Load, and American playwright and novelist Kia Corthron, author of The Castle Cross the Magnet Carter, winner of the Center for Fiction First Novel prize in 2016.

Authors published by Seven Stories

Fiction

Tatamkhulu Afrika
Nelson Algren
Emmanuelle Bayamack-Tam
François Bégaudeau
Ivana Bodrožić
Kate Braverman
Octavia Butler
Anton Chekhov
Harriet Scott Chessman
Céline Curiol
Rick DeMarinis
Alex DiFrancesco
Linh Dinh

Kent H. Dixon
Assia Djebar
Ariel Dorfman
Martin Duberman
Alan Dugan
Marguerite Duras
Annie Ernaux
Marcus Ewert
Barry Gifford
Jean Giono
Beverly Gologorsky
Ivan Goncharov
Almudena Grandes

Robert Graves
Johan Harstad
J.R. Helton
Seba al-Herz
Christopher R. Howard
Hwang Sok-yong
Gary Indiana
Elfriede Jelinek
Guus Kuijer
Lola Lafon
Khary Lazarre-White
Andri Snær Magnason
Avner Mandelman

Stephanie McMillan
Stanley Moss
Luis Negrón
Guadalupe Nettel
Mikael Niemi
Peter Plate
Uday Prakash
Youssef Rakha
Davide Reviati
Yasmina Reza
Charley Rosen
Rosario Santos
Wallace Shawn

Samuel Shem
Layle Silbert
Upton Sinclair
Brian Francis Slattery
Ted Solotaroff
Lee Stringer
Abdellah Taïa
S.P. Tenhoff
Nadia Terranova
Vassilis Vassilikos
Kurt Vonnegut
Martin Winckler
Chavisa Woods

Nonfiction

Craig Aaron
Elizabeth Abbott
Bob Abernethy
Mumia Abu-Jamal
As'ad AbuKhalil
Bruce Ackerman
Ezequiel Adamovsky
Eqbal Ahmad
Michael Albert
Aimee Allison
Anthony Alvarado
Amnesty International
Anna Anthropy
Anthony Arnove
Tom Athanasiou
Aung San Suu Kyi
Bill Ayers
Malaika wa Azania
Normand Baillargeon
Subhankar Banerjee

David Barsamian
Joel Berg
Martin Bossenbroek
Boston Women's Health Book Collective
Art Buchwald
Nina Burleigh
Vitalik Buterin
Klester Cavalcanti
Center for Constitutional Rights
Fairness and Accuracy in Reporting
Noam Chomsky
Angela Davis
Michael Deibert
Emma
Sarah Erdreich
Samuel Epstein
Elizabeth Ewen
Stuart Ewen
Karlene Faith
Josh Fox
Eva Gabrielsson
J. Malcolm Garcia

Loren Glass
Mike Gravel
D.D. Guttenplan
Ed Halter
Shere Hite
Jack Hoffman
Phil Jackson
Russell Jacoby
Wojciech Jagielski
Christina Jarvis
Derrick Jensen
Savannah Knoop
Paul Krassner
Joan Kruckewitt
Kalle Lasn
Andrew Laties
Martha Long
Lydia Lunch
Joel Magnuson
Dale Maharidge
Subcomandante Marcos
Robin Marty

Robert W. McChesney
Suzanne McConnell 
Ralph Nader
Loretta Napoleoni
Huey P. Newton 
William A. Noguera
Gary Null
Greg Palast
Hugh Pearson
Peter Phillips
Sam Pizzigati
Benjamin Pogrund
Ted Rall
Luis J. Rodriguez
Arundhati Roy
Laurie Rubin
Greg Ruggiero
Lynne Sharon Schwartz
Barbara Seaman
Tara Seibel
Vandana Shiva

Nancy Snow
Gregory Sumner
Paco Ignacio Taibo II
John R. Talbott
Leora Tanenbaum
Quincy Troupe
David Van Reybrouck
Barney Rosset
Rodolfo Walsh
Koigi wa Wamwere
Gary Webb
Fred A. Wilcox
Sean Michael Wilson
Minky Worden
Howard Zinn

Siete Cuentos

Julia Alvarez
Gonzàlo Alburto Iniesta
Laura Castañeda
Noam Chomsky*
Angie Cruz*
Ariel Dorfman*
Jack Forbes* 

Jorge Franco
Alejandro Junger
Néstor Kohan
Charles C. Mann*
Subcomandante Marcos
Alfredo Placeres

Tanya Reinhart*
Sonia Rivera-Valdés
Cory Silverberg*
Paco Ignacio Taibo II
Ángela Vallvey 
Howard Zinn*

Triangle Square Books for Young Readers

Julia Alvarez
Ali Berman
Tamara Bower
Seymour Chwast 
Meryl Danziger
Jared Diamond

Ariel Dorfman
Morten Dürr
Marcus Ewert
Robert Graves
Harriet Hyman Alonso
Etgar Keret

Maxine Kumin
Celeste Lecesne
Andri Snær Magnason
Charles C. Mann
Innosanto Nagara
Mark Reibstein

Susan Robeson
Laurie Rubin
José Saramago
Hal Schrieve
Anne Sexton
Cory Silverberg

Ronald Takaki
Olga Tokarczuk
Eymard Toledo
Patrice Vecchione
Emma Williams
Ed Young
Howard Zinn

Award-winning work
Emma Ramadan
2021 – Winner PEN America Translation Prize for A Country for Dying
Emmanuelle Bayamack-Tam
2019 – Winner Prix du Livre Inter for Arcadia
Nadia Terranova
2019 – Winner Premio Alassio Centolibri for Farewell, Ghosts
Morten Dürr
2017 – Winner Danish National Illustration Award for Zenobia
Chavisa Woods
2017 – Winner Shirley Jackson Award for "Take the Way Home That Leads Back to Sullivan Street" in Things To Do When You're Goth in the Country
Davide Reviati
2017 – Winner Attilio Micheluzzi Prize for Best Writing for Spit Three Times
2016 – Winner Carlo Boscarato Prize for Spit Three Times
2016 – Winner Lo Straniero Prize for Spit Three Times 
Yasmina Reza
2016 – Winner Prix Renaudot for Babylon
Annie Ernaux
2022 – Winner Nobel Prize in Literature for her literary works in general
2016 – Winner Strega European Prize for The Years
Lola Lafon
2016 – Winner Prix de la Closerie des Lilas for The Little Communist Who Never Smiled
Corey Silverberg
2016 – Winner Stonewall Book Award for Children's & Young Adult for Sex is a Funny Word 
Kia Corthron
2016 – Winner Center for Fiction First Novel Prize for The Castle Cross the Magnet Carter
Aharon Appelfeld 
2016 – Winner Sydney Taylor Book Award for Adam and Thomas
2016 – Winner Batchelder Honor for Adam and Thomas
Luis Negrón
2014 – Winner Lambda Award for Gay General Fiction for Mundo Cruel
Guadalupe Nettel
2014 – Winner Herralde Novel Prize for The Body Where I was Born
Project Censored
2014 – Winner Whistleblower Summit's Pillar Award for New Media and Journalism
Martin Bossenbroek 
2013 – Winner Libris History Prize for The Boer War
Ivana Bodrožić 
2013 – Winner Prix Ulysse for Hotel Tito
Stephanie McMillan
2012 – Winner Robert F. Kennedy Journalism Award in Cartoon for The Beginning of the American Fall and Code Green
Linh Dinh
2011 – Winner Balcones Fiction Prize Love Like Hate
Barry Gifford
2007 – Winner Christopher Isherwood Foundation Award for Fiction for Memories from a Sinking Ship
Avner Mandelman
2005 – Winner I.J. Siegel Award for Jewish Fiction for Talking to the Enemy 
Ralph Nader
2001 – Winner Firecracker Alternative Book Award for The Ralph Nader Reader
Alan Dugan
2001 – Winner National Book Award for Poetry for Poems Seven 
Jorge Franco
2000 – Winner Dashiell Hammett Prize for Rosario Tijeras
Martin Winckler 
1998 – Winner Prix du Livre for The Case of Dr. Sachs
Sonia Rivera-Valdés
1997 – Winner Casa de las Américas for Las historias prohibidas de Marta Veneranda

References

External links
Seven Stories Press official site
Book Depository article naming Seven Stories Independent Publisher of the Week

Book publishing companies based in New York (state)
Companies based in New York City
Political book publishing companies
Publishing companies established in 1995
1995 establishments in New York (state)